Sandy Valley Local Schools is a school district located in Stark County, Ohio, United States, despite that the schools are in Tuscarawas County. There are three schools, Sandy Valley Elementary, Sandy Valley Middle School and Sandy Valley High School. (SV is considered a Stark County district because the majority of area in the district falls within Stark County. The district also extends into Tuscarawas County (where the campus is located) and Carroll County)

The schools had been made up of East Sparta Elementary, Magnolia Elementary, Waynesburg Elementary, and the Sandy Valley High/Jr. High school. Magnolia housed grade Kindergarten-2nd, Waynesburg held grades 3 and 4. And lastly East Sparta held grades 5–6. The Jr.High/High school held grades 7–12.In 2008 the NEW Elementary was finished right off of route 183. They held a dedication in August and that same year grades Kindergarten-5 moved into the new school. While 6-12 grades stayed in the Old High school/Jr.High until January 20, 2009, when they had a ceremonial walk in 20 degree weather over to the new school—It was only about a parking lot distance away, a small one at that.-- Sandy Valley is home to THE CARDINALS and their colors are Red and gray but are sometimes accented with white. Their best sports consist of track, basketball, cross country, softball and wrestling. They often send runners and wrestlers to state level competition, and have also had success in tournament action with their softball team.

The former elementary schools were once the local high schools, prior to the creation of the Sandy Valley Local School District. Excellent historical information on the original buildings and district history is available from the Magnolia Historical Society or Pike Township Historical Society.

Current administration includes:

Board of Education:
President Scot Bowman (term ends Dec. 31, 2015)
Vice President Lynne Herstine (term ends Dec. 31, 2015)
Member Dennis Corsi (term ends Dec. 31, 2017)
Member Joe Wigfield (term ends Dec. 31, 2015)
Member Isaiah Winters (term ends Dec. 31, 2017)

Superintendent David Fischer
Treasurer Daryll Woolf
Operations Manager Doug Neading
Curriculum Director Patty Main
High School Principal Matt Whitted
Middle School Principal Melissa Kiehl
Elementary Principal Victor Johnson

External links
 Official Site

School districts in Stark County, Ohio